This is a list of Harry Potter cast members who portrayed or voiced characters appearing in the film series. The list below is sorted by film and the character's surname, as some characters have been portrayed by multiple actors.

Overview
Dozens of actors from the United Kingdom and Ireland portrayed or voiced characters appearing in the Harry Potter film series based on the book series by J. K. Rowling. In all the films, Daniel Radcliffe played Harry Potter, Rupert Grint played Ron Weasley and Emma Watson played Hermione Granger. When they were cast only Radcliffe had previously acted in a film. Complementing them on screen are such actors as Helena Bonham Carter, Jim Broadbent, John Cleese, Robbie Coltrane, Warwick Davis, Ralph Fiennes, Michael Gambon, Brendan Gleeson, Richard Griffiths, Richard Harris, John Hurt, Jason Isaacs, Miriam Margolyes, Helen McCrory, Gary Oldman, Alan Rickman, Fiona Shaw, Maggie Smith, Timothy Spall, Imelda Staunton, David Thewlis, Emma Thompson, and Julie Walters, among others. Thirteen actors appeared as the same character in all eight films of the series.

Some well-known British actors who have not appeared in the series were asked in jest why they had not been cast. When David Yates was directing the fifth film, Bill Nighy (who knew Yates personally) said that he hoped the director would cast him in Harry Potter. "But nobody called", Nighy added. However, in 2009, Yates cast Nighy as Minister of Magic Rufus Scrimgeour in the seventh film. Nighy said, "I am no longer the only English actor not to be in Harry Potter and I am very pleased." Jude Law once quipped, "Nobody's asked me. I was a bit too old for Harry." He would later be cast as a younger Albus Dumbledore in Fantastic Beasts: The Crimes of Grindelwald.

J. K. Rowling gave a speech at the premiere of the final film in the series, Harry Potter and the Deathly Hallows – Part 2, on 7 July 2011 in London. Rowling praised the film series' acting talent and announced that there are seven young Harry Potter cast members whom she refers to as "The Big Seven"; they are Radcliffe, Grint, Watson, Tom Felton, Matthew Lewis, Evanna Lynch and Bonnie Wright.

Cast and characters

See also
 Fantastic Beasts cast members

Notes

References

External links

Cast members
Harry Potter lists
List of Potter Harry cast members
Lists of actors by film series